ICV may stand for:

Companies and organizations
 ICVolunteers, non-profit organisation headquartered in Geneva, Switzerland
 Islamic Council of Victoria, representing Muslims in Victoria, Australia
 International Congress of Vexillology
 Initiative for Catalonia Greens, a political party of Catalonia
 Cargolux Italia (ICAO airline designator)

Other uses
 Integrity check value, another name for a checksum
 Interval count vector in music theory, see Interval vector
 International certificate of vaccination, see Carte Jaune
 Infantry combat vehicle, see infantry fighting vehicle
 Intracerebroventricular (ICV) injection, a medicinal route of administration